"From Graceland to the Promised Land" is a song written and recorded by American country music artist Merle Haggard.  It was released in October 1977 as the only single from the album My Farewell to Elvis.  The song reached number 4 on the Billboard Hot Country Singles & Tracks chart.

Content
The song is a tribute to Elvis Presley.

Chart performance

References

1977 singles
1977 songs
Merle Haggard songs
Songs written by Merle Haggard
MCA Records singles